This list of the  is an initiative by the Ministry of Agriculture, Forestry and Fisheries to promote the maintenance and preservation of the terraces alongside public interest in agriculture and rural areas. In 1999, some 134 terraces were selected by a committee of academics from nominations by each prefecture, in 117 municipalities from Tōhoku to Kyūshū.

Terraces

See also
 100 Fishing Village Heritage Sites (Japan)
 100 Soundscapes of Japan
 Rice

References

External links
  100 Terraced Rice Fields of Japan (JARUS (The Japan Association of Rural Solutions for Environmental Conservation and Resource Recycling))
  100 Terraced Rice Fields of Japan (Rice Terrace Network (NPO))

Agriculture in Japan
Environment of Japan
Rice
Agricultural terraces
Tourism in Japan